Taane Milne (born 19 May 1995) is a Fiji international rugby league footballer who plays as a  for the South Sydney Rabbitohs in the NRL.

He previously played for the St. George Illawarra Dragons and the New Zealand Warriors in the National Rugby League, and was contracted to the Wests Tigers. Milne also played for the Mount Pritchard Mounties and the New Zealand Warriors in the Intrust Super Premiership.

Background
Milne was born in Auckland, New Zealand. He is of Māori and Fijian descent. He moved to Australia at a young age.

He played his junior rugby league for the Clovelly Crocodiles and spent some time in rugby union whilst attending Randwick Boys High School and Newington College (2011–2013), where he played junior representative grades for Randwick as well as NSW & Australian Schoolboys teams alongside future Parramatta Eels backrower Tepai Moeroa. He was then signed by the Sydney Roosters.

Playing career

Early career
From 2013 to 2015, Milne played for the Sydney Roosters' NYC team. On 18 October 2014, he played for the Junior Kiwis against the Junior Kangaroos. He was again selected for the Junior Kiwis on 2 May 2015. Milne was released by the Roosters with "A questionable work ethic, including being late for training and poor training performance, coupled with some minor off-field dramas," said to be contributing factors.

On 27 October 2015, he signed a 2-year contract with the St. George Illawarra Dragons starting in 2016.

2016
In round 8, Milne made his NRL debut for the Dragons against the Sydney Roosters. After further games in reserve grade, he returned to centre in first grade for 6 games at the end of season. Teammate Benji Marshall said he, "has one of the best in and aways and flick passes I've seen at training. He is a very talented kid."

He was named in the New Zealand Māori squad for a match against the New Zealand Residents on 15 October 2016.

2017
Milne played in 11 games in 2017, almost entirely from the bench. He scored his first try in round 11 against the Warriors, his sole match starting at centre for the season, and his only try for the year. On 6 May, Milne made his international debut for Fiji against Tonga in the 2017 Pacific Cup. Milne said, "I received a call from Mick Potter to play for Fiji against Samoa last year but I couldn't due to personal reasons, I was disappointed. But I had let him know that I was keen to play for Fiji this year. This has been an emotional moment for me. One of the best things being in camp is the devotion time and learning some Fijian songs. This has been one of the best camps I have ever been in."

In June, Milne signed a two-year contract with the Wests Tigers starting in 2018.

Selected for Fiji in the World Cup at the end of the season, Milne score 2 tries and 2 goals in the opening match against the USA. In his next game, he scored 2 tries and kicked 3 goals against Wales.

2018
Milne was sacked by the Wests Tigers in April 2018 after failing a drugs test. He joined the Mount Pritchard Mounties for the remainder of the 2018 season.
On 4 November, Milne signed a two-year deal with the New Zealand Warriors.  Milne had written a letter to coach Stephen Kearney asking him for a second chance to play in the NRL.  Milne said "I told him I'm not a drug addict," Milne told the Telegraph. "I wrote to him – spelling errors and all – telling him that I wanted to play in the NRL again. That I owned up to my errors and I was on the right track. I knew I could offer something to the club".

2019
In round 25 of the 2019 NRL season, Milne made his return to first grade and made his New Zealand Warriors debut against the Canberra Raiders.

2020
On February 15, Milne suffered a badly broken nose in the pre-season NRL Nines tournament. Then, in March, he suffered a season ending knee injury whilst playing for the New Zealand Canterbury Cup NSW team, and made no appearances in first grade for the season.

In October 2020, he signed a contract to join South Sydney for the 2021 NRL season.

2021
Milne made his club debut for South Sydney in round 10 of the 2021 NRL season against the Cronulla-Sutherland Sharks.  In round 15, he scored his first try for Souths in a 46–0 victory over Brisbane.

In round 17, Milne scored a hat-trick during South Sydney's 46–18 victory over North Queensland.

2022
In round 10 of the 2022 NRL season, Milne scored two tries for South Sydney in a 32–30 victory over  the New Zealand Warriors.
In round 25, Milne scored two tries in the first match to be played at the new Sydney Football Stadium.  South Sydney would lose the match 26-16 to their arch rivals the Sydney Roosters.
The following week in the elimination final, Milne was sin binned twice in South Sydney's 30-14  upset victory over the Sydney Roosters.
In the preliminary final against Penrith, Milne was sent off for a swinging arm to the head of Penrith player Spencer Leniu.  South Sydney would on to lose the match 32-12.  Milne was later suspended for six matches over the incident.

References

External links

New Zealand Warriors profile
NRL profile
St. George Illawarra Dragons profile
2017 RLWC profile

1995 births
Living people
Fiji national rugby league team players
New Zealand rugby league players
New Zealand people of Fijian descent
New Zealand Māori rugby league players
St. George Illawarra Dragons players
New Zealand Warriors players
South Sydney Rabbitohs players
Illawarra Cutters players
Junior Kiwis players
Rugby league centres
Rugby league players from Auckland
People educated at Newington College
Western Suburbs Magpies NSW Cup players